The following are the largest Belgian shopping centers or malls, in terms of Gross Leasable Area (industry standard measurement). Therefore, the list excludes 'mini malls' or shopping galleries like for example the Galeries Royales Saint-Hubert.

Brussels
 Basilix shopping center, Sint-Agatha-Berchem has a retail space of 18.683 m² containing 65 shops.
 City2 shopping mall is located on Rue Neuve/Nieuwstraat. With 104 shops on a surface of 51.000 m² it is the biggest inner city shopping mall in Belgium.
 Docks Bruxsel has 110 shops and restaurants and a cinema with 8 halls, on a total commercial surface area of 41.000 m²
 The W Shopping, also known as Woluwe Shopping Center, in Woluwe-Saint-Lambert, has 130 shops with a commercial surface of 45.000 m².
 Westland Shopping Center, in Anderlecht, has a total of 140 stores with a commercial surface area of 38.000 m².
The Mint in the city center

Charleroi
 Ville 2 located in the city centre has around 140 shops, restaurants, and cinema.
 Rive Gauche is the newest shopping mall in Charleroi, has 95 shops on a commercial area of 39.000 m².

Genk
 Shopping 1 is the first indoor shopping mall established in Belgium. It is located in Genk, Limburg province. The commercial area is 27.100 m² divided into 95 shop-spaces.

Kortrijk
 'K' in Kortrijk is located in Kortrijk, has 95 shops on a commercial area of 34.000 m².
 Ring Shopping Kortrijk Noord has 80 shops and a commercial area of 35.000 m².

Liege
 Belle-Ile has around 56 shops and a commercial area of 30 279 m².
 Galeries Saint Lambert has a surface area of 44.000 m².
 Médiacité, the biggest shopping mall in Wallonia, has 124 stores covering 45.000 m² area.

Louvain-La-Neuve
 L'Esplanade (42.000 m²)

Maasmechelen
 M2 shopping center

Mons
 Les Grands Prés, over 75 shops and restaurants (27.000 m²)

Nivelles
 Shopping Nivelles, located in the Walloon Brabant city, 25 kilometers south of Brussels.

Sint-Niklaas
 Waasland Shopping Center, the second-largest mall in Belgium is located in the Waasland region, 26 km south-west of Antwerp. Its commercial surface of 57.000 m² covers 140 shops. 

Wijnegem
 Wijnegem Shopping Center, in Wijnegem just east of Antwerp, the largest mall in the Benelux in both size and number of shops, with 61.913 m² of retail space and 250 shops.

Notes

Shopping malls
Belgium